Xylenol orange is an organic reagent, most commonly used as a tetrasodium salt as an indicator for metal titrations. When used for metal titrations, it will appear red in the titrand and become yellow once it reaches its endpoint.  Historically, commercial preparations of it have been notoriously impure, sometimes consisting of as little as 20% xylenol orange, and containing large amounts of semi-xylenol orange and iminodiacetic acid.  Purities as high as 90% are now available.

It is fluorescent, and has excitation maximums of 440 & 570 nm and an emission maximum of 610 nm.

References 

Analytical reagents
Triarylmethane dyes
Benzoxathioles
Acetic acids